Matthew Burton may refer to:

Matthew Burton (Australian footballer) (born 1970), Australian rules footballer
Matthew Burton (English footballer) (1897–1940), inter-war English footballer
Matthew Burton (long jumper) (born 1987), British long jumper and champion at the 2013 British Indoor Athletics Championships